Cox's theorem, named after the physicist Richard Threlkeld Cox, is a derivation of the laws of probability theory from a certain set of postulates. This derivation justifies the so-called "logical" interpretation of probability, as the laws of probability derived by Cox's theorem are applicable to any proposition. Logical (also known as objective Bayesian) probability is a type of Bayesian probability. Other forms of Bayesianism, such as the subjective interpretation, are given other justifications.

Cox's assumptions
Cox wanted his system to satisfy the following conditions:

Divisibility and comparability – The plausibility of a proposition is a real number and is dependent on information we have related to the proposition.
Common sense – Plausibilities should vary sensibly with the assessment of plausibilities in the model.
Consistency – If the plausibility of a proposition can be derived in many ways, all the results must be equal.

The postulates as stated here are taken from Arnborg and Sjödin.
"Common sense" includes consistency with Aristotelian logic in the sense that logically equivalent propositions shall have the same plausibility.

The postulates as originally stated by Cox were not mathematically
rigorous (although more so than the informal description above),
as noted by Halpern.  However it appears to be possible
to augment them with various mathematical assumptions made either
implicitly or explicitly by Cox to produce a valid proof.

Cox's notation:

Cox's postulates and functional equations are:
In form of a functional equation

Because of the associative nature of the conjunction in propositional logic, the consistency with logic gives a functional equation saying that the function  is an associative binary operation.
Additionally, Cox postulates the function  to be monotonic.

In case  given  is certain, we have  and  due to the requirement of consistency. The general equation then leads to

This shall hold for any proposition , which leads to

In case  given  is impossible, we have  and  due to the requirement of consistency. The general equation (with the A and B factors switched) then leads to

This shall hold for any proposition , which, without loss of generality, leads to a solution

Due to the requirement of monotonicity, this means that  maps plausibilities to interval .

The plausibility of a proposition determines the plausibility of the proposition's negation.
This postulates the existence of a function  such that

Because "a double negative is an affirmative", consistency with logic gives a functional equation

saying that the function  is an involution, i.e., it is its own inverse.
Furthermore, Cox postulates the function  to be monotonic.

The above functional equations and consistency with logic imply that

and

Abbreviating  and  we get the functional equation

Implications of Cox's postulates
The laws of probability derivable from these postulates are the following. Let  be the plausibility of the proposition  given  satisfying Cox's postulates. Then there is a function  mapping plausibilities to interval [0,1] and a positive number  such that

 Certainty is represented by 
 
 

It is important to note that the postulates imply only these general properties. Then we obtain the laws of probability in a more familiar form:

 
 

Rule 2 is a rule for negation, and rule 3 is a rule for conjunction. Given that any proposition containing conjunction, disjunction, and negation can be equivalently rephrased using conjunction and negation alone (the conjunctive normal form), we can now handle any compound proposition.

The laws thus derived yield finite additivity of probability, but not countable additivity. The measure-theoretic formulation of Kolmogorov assumes that a probability measure is countably additive. This slightly stronger condition is necessary for the proof of certain theorems.

Interpretation and further discussion
Cox's theorem has come to be used as one of the justifications for the use of Bayesian probability theory.  For example, in Jaynes it is discussed in detail in chapters 1 and 2 and is a cornerstone for the rest of the book.  Probability is interpreted as a formal system of logic, the natural extension of Aristotelian logic (in which every statement is either true or false) into the realm of reasoning in the presence of uncertainty.

It has been debated to what degree the theorem excludes alternative models for reasoning about uncertainty.  For example, if certain "unintuitive" mathematical assumptions were dropped then alternatives could be devised, e.g., an example provided by Halpern. However Arnborg and Sjödin suggest additional
"common sense" postulates, which would allow the assumptions to be relaxed in some cases while still ruling out the Halpern example. Other approaches were devised by Hardy or Dupré and Tipler.

Jaynes cites Abel for the first known use of the associativity functional equation. János Aczél provides a long proof of the "associativity equation" (pages 256-267). Jaynes reproduces the shorter proof by Cox in which differentiability is assumed. A guide to Cox's theorem by Van Horn aims at comprehensively introducing the reader to all these references.

See also 
 Probability axioms
 Probability logic

References

Further reading

Probability theorems
Probability interpretations
Theorems in statistics